Wilson Lake is the name of seven lakes in Wisconsin, United States, as well as four flowages and a pond.  Below are listed the county, acres, and maximum depth of the lakes.

Wilson